Anouk Schemmekes (born 8 April 1975), professionally known by the mononym Anouk, is a Dutch singer and songwriter. After her 1997 breakthrough rock single Nobody's Wife, she had hit records in the Dutch and Belgian charts. Many of her albums topped the Dutch album charts; most of them going Platinum and several debuting in the number 1 position. Her most famous singles include: R U Kiddin' Me, Michel, Girl, Lost, Modern World, Three Days in a Row, Birds, and Woman.

Anouk had released thirteen studio albums by 2022, a mix of anglophonic rock, pop and adult contemporary; one of which was recorded in the U.S., produced by Glen Ballard. In recent years, she has expanded into Dutch, more folky lyrics. Her 2022 album, was called "Trails of Fails".

Anouk represented the Netherlands at the Eurovision Song Contest 2013 in Malmö, Sweden, with the song "Birds". Her song made it to the final – the first time since 2004 for the Netherlands, finished 9th with 114 points, and scored her another big domestic hit.

Biography

1970s to 2000s: Beginnings and breakthrough

Anouk Teeuwe was born on 8 April 1975, in The Hague, Netherlands. As a teenager, she used drugs and ended up living in several care homes after she ran away from her family at the age of fourteen. Anouk's interest in music was triggered through her mother, who was a blues singer. Anouk gave her first performance at fifteen and sang at weddings and parties with the band Shotgun Wedding. She started attending the Rotterdam Conservatory in 1994, but dropped out two years later. In the same period, her then-husband and manager Edwin Jansen introduced Anouk to Golden Earring frontman Barry Hay. Hay believed her to have talent and offered to write some songs for her. One of those songs was "Mood Indigo"; written in collaboration with fellow Golden Earring member George Kooymans.

After she met Bart van Veen, her co-writer, the pair wrote a few songs. On 5 September 1997, she released her second single, "Nobody's Wife", which remained at the top of the Dutch music charts for a number of weeks and was a hit in Norway and Sweden. Her debut album Together Alone turned out to be a huge success. In 1998, Anouk won two awards from Dutch music channel TMF in addition to an Edison Award. During the summer, she played at various festivals. Her second album Urban Solitude was released in November 1999, and included the single "R U Kiddin' Me". This song reached the Dutch Top 100. Shortly afterwards, Anouk went to the United States to pursue a record deal. Negotiations with her American label (Sony) ended badly, causing her to return to the Netherlands without a deal. She released a new song, "Don't", and began touring the Netherlands in February 2001.

In March 2001, she released, Lost Tracks, which contained acoustic versions and B-sides from older songs, and various duets with K's Choice singer Sam Bettens and The Anonymous Mis. She was awarded the Popprijs award in 2001. In November 2002, the album Graduated Fool was released. This was the heaviest rock album in Anouk's career so far.
Anouk received a Golden Harp in 2003. The following full-length release is called Hotel New York (2004) and yielded a total of four singles: "Girl", "Lost", "Jerusalem" and "One Word". In 2006, she won the 3FM award for best Dutch female singer. In 2007, Anouk released Who's Your Momma, recorded with producer Glen Ballard. The first single, "Good God" was a success, and became a playable song in the video game Guitar Hero World Tour in 2008. In 2009, she released her album For Bitter or Worse. The song "Three Days in a Row" reached the first place in the Dutch charts.

2010s: Eurovision Song Contest participation and subsequent projects

Anouk's album To Get Her Together was released in the Netherlands in May 2011. On 28 February 2011 Anouk placed one of the new tracks on YouTube named "Killer Bee". The first single of the album is called "Down & Dirty" and came out in April. On 27 June, Anouk released her single "I'm a Cliché". On 17 September 2011 "Save Me" was released as third single from the album. The fourth single is "What Have You Done".
Anouk performed at the GelreDome in Arnhem for her To Get Her Together Tour on 8 and 11 March 2012.

Anouk first revealed that she would be taking part in the Eurovision Song Contest 2013 on 17 October 2012 via a post on Facebook, after negotiations with broadcaster TROS. Her song was officially revealed on 11 March 2013. Anouk performed "Birds" in the first semi-final on 14 May, where she progressed to the final on 18 May and eventually reached 9th place there with her song "Birds". The Dutch broadly perceived her result to be a major achievement, as it was the best Eurovision result for the Netherlands in 14 years and the first time in 9 years that any Dutch entrant had qualified for the final of the contest. Her backing singer, Shirma Rouse, was named best backing singer by The Eurovision Times. Anouk wrote the 2015 Dutch entry "Walk Along", performed by Trijntje Oosterhuis, along with Swedish songwriter Tobias Karlsson.

Anouk was a coach on The Voice of Holland for seasons 6 and 8 through 12 before resigning in January 2022 as a result of sexual misconduct allegations beleaguering the show.

In 2016, Anouk released two albums: Queen for a Day, which included the lead single "Run Away Together", in March and Fake It Till We Die in late October.

In 2018, Anouk released her first Dutch-language album Wen d'r maar aan.

Musical style
Anouk's musical style has been described as a combination of Joan Osborne, Melissa Etheridge and Alanis Morissette. She is known for explosive rock songs like "Nobody's Wife" and R U kiddin' me, but has also made small and fragile songs like "Lost" and "Michel". In addition to her pop/rock sound she also experiments with soul, funk and hip hop.

Personal life
Anouk has six children. She was married to her manager Edwin Jansen until 1998. She married Remon Stotijn (aka The Anonymous Mis), frontman of the reggae/rap band Postmen, on 16 March 2004. Stotijn is the father of three of her children; son Benjahmin Kingsley (b. 18 April 2002), son Elijah Jeramiah (b. 5 December 2003) and daughter Phoenix Ray (b. 3 June 2005). In May 2008, Anouk and Remon announced a "harmonious" mutual separation. In 2010, Anouk gave birth to her fourth child, a son named Jesiah Dox. Her son Sion Jethro was born in June 2014. In June 2016, she gave birth to her sixth child, a baby girl, Jelizah Rose, with mixed martial artist and former basketball player Dominique Schemmekes, whom she married in June 2022.

Discography

 Together Alone (1997)
 Urban Solitude (1999)
 Graduated Fool (2002)
 Hotel New York (2004)
 Who's Your Momma? (2007)
 For Bitter or Worse (2009)
 To Get Her Together (2011)
 Sad Singalong Songs (2013)
 Paradise and Back Again (2014)
 Queen for a Day (2016)
 Fake It Till We Die (2016)
 Wen d'r maar aan (2018)
 Trails of Fails (2022)

Awards and nominations
Dutch TMF Awards

In 2006, Dutch singer Marco Borsato joined Anouk in announcing their withdrawal from future TMF Awards-nominations. "Every year the same faces can get boring".

Edison Awards

3FM Radio Awards

Belgian TMF Awards

MTV Europe Music Awards

Other Awards
Noorderslag Popprijs 2001
 Golden Harp 2003
Two medals (best female and single international "Girl") on Humo's Pop Poll 2005 Belgium
Duiveltje 2004 (best female singer)

References

External links 

 

1975 births
Dutch pop singers
Dutch rock singers
Dutch soul singers
English-language singers from the Netherlands
Eurovision Song Contest entrants for the Netherlands
Eurovision Song Contest entrants of 2013
MTV Europe Music Award winners
Women post-grunge singers
Women rock singers
Living people
Musicians from The Hague
20th-century Dutch women singers
21st-century Dutch women singers
21st-century Dutch singers
Dutch people of Frisian descent